The Broxtowe by-election was held on 17 September 1953.  It was held due to the death of the incumbent Labour MP Seymour Cocks.  It was won by the Labour candidate William Warbey.

References

By-elections to the Parliament of the United Kingdom in Nottinghamshire constituencies
Broxtowe by-election
Broxtowe by-election
Broxtowe by-election
20th century in Nottinghamshire